The Tuvaluan dollar is one of the currencies of Tuvalu, whose unofficial international currency code is TVD. Tuvalu has never had banknotes of its own, and has been issuing coins since 1976. However, the Tuvaluan dollar is used as a unit of account, and is pegged to the Australian dollar (the other currency of Tuvalu) at parity. From 1966 to 1976, Tuvalu officially used the Australian dollar. In 1976, Tuvalu began issuing its own coins, which continue to circulate alongside Australian coins. Tuvalu continues to use Australian banknotes. Tuvaluan coins are not legal tender in Australia. Similar to the Faroese króna's relationship to the Danish krone and the Panamanian balboa's relationship to the United States dollar, the Tuvaluan dollar is not an independent currency, but a variation of the Australian dollar.

Tuvalu does not have a monetary authority or central bank, and the National Bank of Tuvalu, the only bank in Tuvalu, performs some monetary functions for the government, including the holding of government accounts and foreign assets.

Other currencies that had been used in Tuvalu have been the British pound sterling, prior to the introduction of the Australian dollar, as well as the US dollar, during the World War II American occupation of the islands. Gilbert and Ellice Islands banknotes had also been used in Tuvalu. These notes were cashier's cheques backed in pounds rather than an official, independent currency. The yen-backed Oceania pound was used in parts of the Gilberts (now Kiribati), but Japanese influence never actually reached the Ellice Chain (now Tuvalu).

Coins

In 1976, corresponding with its slated independence, Tuvalu's first coins were introduced in denominations of 1, 2, 5, 10, 20, 50 cents and 1 dollar. The set, designed by John Donald features an aquatic theme. The bronze 1 and 2 cents and the cupro-nickel 5, 10 and 20 cents were the same size, weight, and composition as the corresponding Australian coins they were set to constitute. However, the cupro-nickel 50 cent piece was distinct from the dodecagonal (twelve-sided) Australian 50 cent coin in that it was round with plain edges. The nonagonal (nine-sided) cupro-nickel 1 dollar piece was unique not only by its odd shape but it also predated the Australian 1 dollar coin by eight years. It was also issued long before the trend toward larger denomination coins became much more widespread in many countries.  The nine sides on the dollar are meant to represent each of the nine islands and atolls composing the Tuvalu chain. Each of the coins depicts a sea animal that is native to the area, with the only exception to that being the 1 cent, which depicts an empty spider conch shell washed up on the shore.

The 1976 series also included the introduction of Tuvalu's first silver and gold proof bullion coins. A silver 5 dollar piece and a gold 50 dollar piece. They are considered an official release and legal tender within Tuvalu.

Although Australia withdrew their 1 and 2 cent coins from circulation in 1991 there was still demand for the two lower denominations in Tuvalu so these continued to be retained well after Australia discontinued use. However, as prices and shipping costs have progressively risen the 1 and 2 cent coins have since been withdrawn from circulation.

Australia introduced a  coin to replace the note in 1988, but Tuvaluan  coins have never been introduced. Instead, the Australian piece circulates in place. In recent years, Tuvaluans have also taken a preference to Australia's smaller, round, brass dollar over their own large, clumsy nonogonal ones, and are thus seen a little less often.

In 1994, the Queen's profile was changed in tandem with many other Commonwealth states to the more recent Raphael Maklouf design. Older coins dated 1976-1985 feature the Arnold Machin design. After the 1994 issue, Tuvaluan coins ceased to be produced and Australian coins sent in their stead. However, Tuvalu coins remain as legal tender and continue to circulate alongside Australian ones.

Tuvalu also issues a fair number of non-circulating bullion type coins and colourised commemoratives. These non-circulating bullion coins are produced by the Perth Mint, which is owned by the Government of Western Australia. The deal between the Government of Tuvalu (as issuing authority) and Perth Mint allows Tuvalu to receive a minimum of about $200,000 per year in royalties from the production of these coins.

Queen Elizabeth II is depicted on all coins issued by Tuvalu. There have been calls from some politicians to abolish Tuvalu's monarchy and remove the sovereign's image from all future coins, however, a majority vote decided otherwise.

The reverse of each coin depicts as follows:

Banknotes
In 1942, local banknotes were issued by the colonial government of the Gilbert and Ellice Islands in denominations of 1, 2, 5, and 10 shillings and £1 with equivalent value to the Australian pound.

Since 1966, the official currency of Tuvalu is the Australian dollar, with Australian banknotes having been in use prior to and after independence. However, after independence was achieved, the  note was withdrawn from circulation to encourage the use of the  coin.

See also
 Kiribati dollar
 Australian dollar

Notes

References

 

Currencies of the Commonwealth of Nations
Currencies of Oceania
Circulating currencies
Dollar
Fixed exchange rate
Currencies introduced in 1976